Johan Nygaardsvold (6 September 1879 – 13 March 1952) was a Norwegian politician from the Labour Party who served as the 21st prime minister of Norway from 1935 to 1945. From June 1940 until May 1945, he oversaw the Norwegian Government-in-exile from London as head of the Nygaardsvold cabinet during the occupation of Norway by Nazi Germany.

Background
Nygaardsvold was born in Hommelvik, the main centre of the municipality of Malvik in the county of Sør-Trøndelag, Norway. His parents were Anders Nygaardsvold (1839–1897) and Andrea Ratvold (1845–1929). His father was a tenant farmer and a founding member of the first labour union in the area. Johan took his first job as a lumber mill worker when he was 12 years old. On 6 June 1901, he married Albine Regine Brandslet (1878–1961). 

Nygaardsvold and his wife emigrated to Canada in 1902 where he took jobs in British Columbia, and in the US in Kalispell, Montana and Spokane, Washington. He and his wife returned to Norway in 1907 after he had followed a career including as an Industrial Workers of the World agitator. In 1909 he found a job at Hommelvik Sawmill.

Political career

In 1910, Nygaardsvold was elected to the board of education for the Labour Party, and rose quickly through the ranks in local politics. In 1916, he was elected to the Norwegian parliament for the first time, serving continuously until 1949. He worked as a labourer in the Swedish lumber industry during the summers in the first few years. From 1920 to 1922 he served as the mayor for his home town of Malvik.

In 1928, Nygaardsvold was appointed minister of agriculture in the short-lived Christopher Hornsrud cabinet. From 11 January 1934 to 20 March 1935 he served as President of the Storting. In 1935, Nygaardsvold was asked to form a government as Prime Minister of Norway.
He was serving as Prime Minister when Nazi Germany attacked on Norway 9 April 1940. Following the German occupation of Norway, German officials demanded that the Government headed by Nygaardsvold capitulate and that the King appoint a government headed by Nazi sympathiser Vidkun Quisling. King Haakon VII stated that he could not comply with the German ultimatum and would rather abdicate than appoint Quisling prime minister. On 7 June 1940, the Norwegian Government-in-exile relocated  to London. Nygaardsvold continued as prime minister in exile until the government returned to Norway on 31 May 1945. He  resigned on 25 June 1945 when King Haakon appointed Einar Gerhardsen to head an interim government composed of all political parties.

A number of progressive reforms were instituted during Nygaardsvold's time as prime minister. Reforms included the introduction of national pension insurance, compulsory unemployment insurance for many employees and workers outside the primary sector. Another piece of legislation, the Worker Protection Act, regulated working hours in industry and mining, including granting public holidays, mandated health inspections for workers in "unhealthy" industries, and granted maternity leave. The same Act raised the age for admission to employment in industry, commerce, offices, and land transport from 14 to 15 years. Legislation was also enacted mandating inspections of electrical equipment in some industries. An old-age pension was introduced for Norwegian citizens over 70 years old. A disability pension was also introduced. Another set of reforms involved stabilising pay rates, setting payment intervals, and regulating dismissal and providing certain rights to dismissed workers, and businesses with more than ten employees were required to have "rules of employment".

An Act of the 18th of June 1938 “empowers the Government to issue regulations dealing with the length of working hours and with medical inspection of workers exposed to X-rays, radium and the radio-active substances. In addition, under an Order of the 18th of November 1938, “the enforcement of the Workers' Protection Act on the State railways has been brought within the competence of the ordinary labour inspectorate.” An Act of the 8th of April 1938 provides that “any company or private undertaking with a share capital or net assets amounting to 100,000 crowns must make appropriations to a Labour Fund. Certain types of undertakings, particularly in agriculture, forestry and fishing, are however exempt from this obligation. Contributions are compulsory only when the net profits of the undertaking exceed a certain percentage of its invested capital; the rate varies with the financial results of each business year. The moneys of the Labour Fund are to be used for payment of old-age and invalidity pensions or for relief of unemployment due to the suspension, transformation or restriction of the work of the undertaking.” Detailed regulations concerning all kinds of electrical installations were issued on the 29th of December 1939, while regulations concerning cinemas and films were promulgated on the 20th of February 1939. Instructions issued on the 31st of March 1938 for officials of the State Labour Inspectorate prescribed “in considerable detail the duties and powers of the Chief Labour Inspector, the general and special Labour Inspectors, the Assistant Labour Inspectors and the Labour Boards with respect to the enforcement of the Workers' Protection Act. The instructions specify that the inspector is to be impartial and is to try to convince both employers and workers of the value of the provisions of the Act. He is to act as an adviser to both parties in all matters connected with the Act.” An Act of the 10th of March and a decree of 24th March 1939 “regulate inspection on board ship.” An Act of the 20th of May 1939 amended the compulsory sickness insurance scheme “by permitting sickness funds which do not enter into a contract with doctors to pay directly to the practitioners the amounts due for medical treatment given to insured persons. This new rule dispenses the insured persons from the need for advancing the doctors' fees and enables the funds to exercise more effective supervision than in the past over the treatment given by the doctors.” Also, in “the event of an accident due to the war and involving permanent incapacity or death seamen are now entitled to pensions and allowances in accordance with the provisions laid down by the Act of 12 March 1937 and the Royal Order of 21 May 1937. This means that the maximum rates of wages taken as a basis for calculating pensions and allowances are doubled. In addition, any seaman who is totally incapacitated as a result of a war injury receives a lump sum of 10,000 Kr. In the event of death his dependants (widow and children under 15 years) receive, in addition to their pensions, a lump sum of the same amount as for permanent incapacity.” Under a Royal Order of the 22nd of December 1939 issued in pursuance of a decision of the Storting of the 15th of September 1939 the State “makes itself responsible for the risks of persons engaged in sea fishing, including seal hunting and also, to some extent, whaling. In case of an accident due to an act of war the protection resulting from this provision is similar to that granted to seamen. If the ship is lost the fishermen concerned also receive allowances at specified rates for the resulting unemployment and for the loss of their belongings.” A State Holiday Council (Statens Ferierad) was set up, and an Act of the 15th of February 1918 “was amended by an Act of 20 May 1939 to secure better supervision of home work. The Act provides for this purpose that the records kept by employers or sub-contractors must henceforward contain, as well as the workers' names and addresses, information on the nature of the work performed and the minimum wages paid. The powers of the labour inspectorate in particular have also been increased as regards home work.” 

Nygaardsvold was elected to the Storting for the last time in the autumn of 1945. At the end of the Storting term in 1949, he retired from politics. That same year, he was awarded the Medal for Outstanding Civic Service (Borgerdådsmedaljen).  He returned to Hommelvik and died of cancer in Trondheim in 1952. He was buried at Hommelvik Church in Malvik.

Historical legacy
During his time in office, Nygaardsvold had immense popular appeal and was given credit for the Labour Party's election results in 1933. Nygaardsvold was the prime minister in the second Labour Party cabinet in Norway, after he helped formulate the so-called "crisis accord" with the Farmers' Party. His government's domestic policy was largely dedicated to recovering from the Great Depression but is most noted for its foreign and military policy in the years leading up to the occupation of Norway by Nazi Germany and his administration in exile from 1940 to 1945. The investigative commission that issued a report after the liberation of Norway found that he could not be absolved from responsibility for the lack of operational readiness for the German invasion but gave him credit for his management of a unity government in exile. He was awarded an honorary salary for his service in exile but refused to accept it.

References

Other sources
Berntsen, Harald  (1991) I malstrømmen : Johan Nygaardsvold 1879–1952 (Oslo: Aschehoug) .

Related reading
Andenaes, Johs; Riste, Olav;  Skodvin, Magne  (1966) Norway and the Second World War (Oslo: Johan Grundt Tanum Forlag).

1879 births
1952 deaths
People from Malvik
Ministers of Agriculture and Food of Norway
Labour Party (Norway) politicians
Norwegian people of World War II
World War II political leaders
Presidents of the Storting
Members of the Storting
Industrial Workers of the World members
20th-century Norwegian politicians
Prime Ministers of Norway